In mathematics, a Hausdorff space X is called a fixed-point space if every continuous function   has a fixed point.

The open interval (a, b), however, is not a fixed point space. To see it, consider the function 
, for example. 

Any linearly ordered space that is connected and has a top and a bottom element is a fixed point space. 

Note that, in the definition, we could easily have disposed of the condition that the space is Hausdorff.

References
 Vasile I. Istratescu, Fixed Point Theory, An Introduction, D. Reidel, the Netherlands (1981).  
 Andrzej Granas and James Dugundji, Fixed Point Theory (2003) Springer-Verlag, New York, 
 William A. Kirk and Brailey Sims, Handbook of Metric Fixed Point Theory (2001), Kluwer Academic, London 

Fixed points (mathematics)
Topology
Topological spaces